The timeline of the evolutionary history of life represents the current scientific theory outlining the major events during the development of life on planet Earth. Dates in this article are consensus estimates based on scientific evidence, mainly fossils.

In biology, evolution is any change across successive generations in the heritable characteristics of biological populations. Evolutionary processes give rise to diversity at every level of biological organization, from kingdoms to species, and individual organisms and molecules, such as DNA and proteins. The similarities between all present day organisms imply a common ancestor from which all known species, living and extinct, have diverged. More than 99 percent of all species that ever lived (over five billion) are estimated to be extinct. Estimates on the number of Earth's current species range from 10 million to 14 million, with about 1.2 million or 14% documented, the rest not yet described. However, a 2016 report estimates an additional 1 trillion microbial species, with only 0.001% described.

There has been controversy between more traditional views of steadily increasing biodiversity, and a newer view of cycles of annihilation and diversification, so that certain past times, such as the Cambrian explosion, experienced maximums of diversity followed by sharp winnowing.

Extinction 

Species go extinct constantly as environments change, as organisms compete for environmental niches, and as genetic mutation leads to the rise of new species from older ones. At long irregular intervals, Earth's biosphere suffers a catastrophic die-off, a mass extinction, often comprising an accumulation of smaller extinction events over a relatively brief period.

The first known mass extinction was the Great Oxidation Event 2.4 billion years ago, which killed most of the planet's obligate anaerobes. Researchers have identified five other major extinction events in Earth's history, with estimated losses below:

End Ordovician: 440 million years ago, 86% of all species lost, including graptolites
Late Devonian: 375 million years ago, 75% of species lost, including most trilobites
End Permian, The Great Dying: 251 million years ago, 96% of species lost, including tabulate corals, and most trees and synapsids
End Triassic: 200 million years ago, 80% of species lost, including all conodonts
End Cretaceous: 66 million years ago, 76% of species lost, including all ammonites, mosasaurs, plesiosaurs, pterosaurs, and nonavian dinosaurs

Smaller extinction events have occurred in the periods between, with some dividing geologic time periods and epochs. The Holocene extinction event is currently under way.

Factors in mass extinctions include continental drift, changes in atmospheric and marine chemistry, volcanism and other aspects of mountain formation, changes in glaciation, changes in sea level, and impact events.

Detailed timeline 

In this timeline, Ma (for megaannum) means "million years ago," ka (for kiloannum) means "thousand years ago," and ya means "years ago."

Hadean Eon 

4540 Ma – 4000 Ma

Archean Eon 

4000 Ma – 2500 Ma

Proterozoic Eon 

2500 Ma – 539 Ma. Contains the Palaeoproterozoic, Mesoproterozoic and Neoproterozoic eras.

Phanerozoic Eon 

539 Ma – present

The Phanerozoic Eon (Greek: period of well-displayed life) marks the appearance in the fossil record of abundant, shell-forming and/or trace-making organisms. It is subdivided into three eras, the Paleozoic, Mesozoic and Cenozoic, with major mass extinctions at division points.

Palaeozoic Era 

538.8 Ma – 251.9 Ma and contains the Cambrian, Ordovician, Silurian, Devonian, Carboniferous and Permian periods.

Mesozoic Era 

From 251.9 Ma to 66 Ma and containing the Triassic, Jurassic and Cretaceous periods.

Cenozoic Era 

66 Ma – present

See also 

 Evolutionary history of plants (timeline)
 Geologic time scale
 History of Earth
 Sociocultural evolution
 Timeline of human evolution

References

Bibliography

Further reading

External links 
 
  Explore complete phylogenetic tree interactively
 
 
  Interactive timeline from Big Bang to present
  Sequence of Plant Evolution
  Sequence of Animal Evolution
 
 
 
 Art of the Nature Timelines on Wikipedia

Evolution-related timelines
Origin of life
evolution